Migration Assistant may refer to:

 Migration Assistant (Apple), a utility that transfers data, user accounts, computer settings and apps from one Macintosh computer, or backup, to another computer
 Migration Assistant (Linux)